Susanna Gossweiler (1740–1793), was a Swiss educator.  She was appointed the first principal of the girls' school  in Zürich in 1774, and regarded a pioneer of women's education in Switzerland.

References

1740 births
1793 deaths
18th-century Swiss educators
Swiss women educators